The rhesus macaque (Macaca mulatta), colloquially rhesus monkey, is a species of Old World monkey. There are between six and nine recognised subspecies that are split between two groups, the Chinese-derived and the Indian-derived. It is native to South, Central, and Southeast Asia and has the widest geographic range of all non-human primates, occupying a great diversity of altitudes and a great variety of habitats, from grasslands to arid and forested areas, but also close to human settlements. Feral colonies are found in the United States, thought to be either released by humans or escapees after hurricanes destroyed zoo and wildlife park facilities.

The rhesus macaque is diurnal, arboreal, and terrestrial. It is mostly herbivorous, mainly eating fruit, but will also consume seeds, roots, buds, bark, and cereals. Studies show almost 100 different plant species in its diet. Rhesus macaques are generalist omnivores, and have a highly varied and flexible diet. With an increase in anthropogenic land changes, rhesus macaques have evolved alongside intense and rapid environmental disturbance associated with human agriculture and urbanization resulting in proportions of their diet to be altered. It will also eat invertebrates, drink water from streams and rivers, and has specialised cheek pouches where it can temporarily store food.

Like other macaques, the rhesus macaque is gregarious, with troops comprising 20–200 individuals. The social groups are matrilineal, whereby a female's rank is decided by the rank of her mother. There has been extensive research into female philopatry, common in social animals, as females tend not to leave the social group. The rhesus macaque communicates with a variety of facial expressions, vocalisations, body postures, and gestures. Facial expressions are used to appease or redirect aggression, assert dominance, and threaten other individuals, and vocalisations may be made to elicit grooming, while moving, or in threatening situations. It spends most of its day feeding and resting; the remainder is occupied with traveling, grooming, and playing.

Due to its relatively easy upkeep, wide availability, and closeness to humans anatomically and physiologically, it has been used extensively in medical and biological research on human and animal health-related topics. It has facilitated many scientific breakthroughs including vaccines for rabies, smallpox, and polio and antiretroviral medication to treat HIV/AIDS. A rhesus macaque became the first primate astronaut in 1948, but died during the flight, followed on 14 June 1949 by Albert II, who became the first primate and first mammal in space. It is listed as Least Concern in the IUCN Red List of Threatened Species in view of its wide distribution, presumed large population, and its tolerance of a broad range of habitats.

Etymology 
The name "rhesus" is reminiscent of the mythological king Rhesus of Thrace, a minor character in the Iliad. However, the French naturalist Jean-Baptiste Audebert, who applied the name to the species, stated: "it has no meaning". The rhesus macaque is also known colloquially as the "rhesus monkey".

An archaic name for the rhesus macaque, in use in the 19th century, is "bruh".

Taxonomy 

According to Zimmermann's first description of 1780, the rhesus macaque is distributed in eastern Afghanistan, Bangladesh, Bhutan, as far east as the Brahmaputra Valley, Barak valley and in peninsular India, Nepal, and northern Pakistan. Today, this is known as the Indian rhesus macaque M. m. mulatta, which includes the morphologically similar M. rhesus villosus, described by True in 1894, from Kashmir, and M. m. mcmahoni, described by Pocock in 1932 from Kootai, Pakistan. Several Chinese subspecies of rhesus macaques were described between 1867 and 1917. The molecular differences identified among populations, however, are alone not consistent enough to conclusively define any subspecies.

The Chinese subspecies can be divided as follows:
 M. m. mulatta is found in western and central China, in the south of Yunnan, and southwest of Guangxi;
 M. m. lasiota (Gray, 1868), the west Chinese rhesus macaque, is distributed in the west of Sichuan, northwest of Yunnan, and southeast of Qinghai; it is possibly synonymous with M. m. sanctijohannis (R. Swinhoe, 1867), if not with M. m. mulatta.
 M. m. tcheliensis (Milne-Edwards, 1870), the north Chinese rhesus macaque, lives in the north of Henan, south of Shanxi, and near Beijing. Some consider it as the most endangered subspecies. Others consider it possibly synonymous with M. m. sanctijohannis, if not with M. m. mulatta.
 M. m. vestita (Milne-Edwards, 1892), the Tibetan rhesus macaque, lives in the southeast of Tibet, northwest of Yunnan (Deqing), and perhaps including Yushu; it is possibly synonymous with M. m. sanctijohannis, if not with M. m. mulatta.
 M. m. littoralis (Elliot, 1909), the south Chinese rhesus macaque, lives in Fujian, Zhejiang, Anhui, Jiangxi, Hunan, Hubei, Guizhou, northwest of Guangdong, north of Guangxi, northeast of Yunnan, east of Sichuan, and south of Shaanxi; it is possibly synonymous with M. m. sanctijohannis, if not with M. m. mulatta.
 M. m. brevicaudus, also referred to as Pithecus brevicaudus (Elliot, 1913), lives on the Hainan Island and Wanshan Islands in Guangdong, and the islands near Hong Kong; it may be synonymous with M. m. mulatta.
 M. m. siamica (Kloss, 1917), the Indochinese rhesus macaque, is distributed in Myanmar, in the north of Thailand and Vietnam, in Laos, and in the Chinese provinces of Anhui, northwest Guangxi, Guizhou, Hubei, Hunan, central and eastern Sichuan, and western and south-central Yunnan; possibly synonymous with M. m. sanctijohannis, if not with M. m. mulatta.

Description 

The rhesus macaque is brown or grey in color and has a pink face, which is bereft of fur. It has, on average, 50 vertebrae and a wide rib cage. The ratio of arm length to leg length is 89.6–94.3%.

Distribution and habitat 
Rhesus macaques are native to India, Bangladesh, Pakistan, Nepal, Myanmar, Thailand, Afghanistan, Vietnam, southern China, and some neighbouring areas. They have the widest geographic ranges of any non-human primate, occupying a great diversity of altitudes throughout Central, South, and Southeast Asia. They are strong swimmers, and can swim across rivers. Rhesus macaques are noted for their tendency to move from rural to urban areas, coming to rely on handouts or refuse from humans. They adapt well to human presence, and form larger troops in human-dominated landscapes than in forests. Rhesus monkeys live in patches of forest within agricultural areas, which gives them access to agroecosystem habitats and makes them at ease in navigating through them.

The southern and the northern distributional limits for rhesus and bonnet macaques, respectively, currently run parallel to each other in the western part of India, are separated by a large gap in the center, and converge on the eastern coast of the peninsula to form a distribution overlap zone. This overlap region is characterized by the presence of mixed-species troops, with pure troops of both species sometimes occurring even in close proximity to one another. The range extension of rhesus macaque – a natural process in some areas, and a direct consequence of introduction by humans in other regions – poses grave implications for the endemic and declining populations of bonnet macaques in southern India.

Kumar et al (2013) provides a summary of population distribution and habitat in India. It states that there were sightings of rhesus macaques in all surveyed habitats except semi-evergreen forests.

Fossil record
Fossilized isolated teeth and mandible fragments from Tianyuan Cave and a juvenile maxilla from Wanglaopu Cave near Zhoukoudian represent the first recognized occurrence of rhesus macaque fossils in the far north of China, and thus the population of rhesus macaques which lived around Beijing decades ago is believed to have originated from Pleistocene ancestors rather than being human-introduced. Fossil mandible fragments from the Taedong River Basin around Pyongyang, North Korea, have also been assigned to this species.

Feral colonies 
Rhesus macaques have also been introduced to other areas, such as the United States, and become feral.

Around the spring of 1938, a colony of rhesus macaques was released in and around Silver Springs in Florida by a tour boat operator known locally as "Colonel Tooey" to enhance his "Jungle Cruise". A traditional story that the monkeys were released for scenery enhancement in the Tarzan movies that were filmed at that location is false, as the only Tarzan movie filmed in the area, 1939's Tarzan Finds a Son!, does not contain rhesus macaques.

Various colonies of rhesus macaque are speculated to be the result of zoos and wildlife parks destroyed in hurricanes, most notably Hurricane Andrew. A 2020 estimate put the number at 550–600 rhesus macaques living in the state; officials have caught more than 1000 of the monkeys in the past decade. Most of the captured monkeys tested positive for herpes B virus, which leads wildlife officials to consider the animals a public health hazard.

Feral colonies have also resulted from research activities. There is a colony of rhesus macaques on Morgan Island, one of the Sea Islands in the South Carolina Lowcountry. They were imported in the 1970s for use in the local labs. Another research colony was established by the Caribbean Primate Research Center of the University of Puerto Rico on the island of Cayo Santiago, off of Puerto Rico. There are no predators on the island, and humans are not permitted to land, except as part of the research program. Another Puerto Rico research colony was released into the Desecheo National Wildlife Refuge in 1966.  they are continuing to do ecological harm, damage crops amounting to $300,000/year and cost $1,000,000/year to manage.

Ecology and behavior 

Rhesus macaques are diurnal animals, and both arboreal and terrestrial. They are quadrupedal and, when on the ground, they walk digitigrade and plantigrade. They are mostly herbivorous, feeding mainly on fruit, but also eating seeds, roots, buds, bark, and cereals. They are estimated to consume around 99 different plant species in 46 families. During the monsoon season, they get much of their water from ripe and succulent fruit. Macaques living far from water sources lick dewdrops from leaves and drink rainwater accumulated in tree hollows. They have also been observed eating termites, grasshoppers, ants, and beetles. When food is abundant, they are distributed in patches, and forage throughout the day in their home ranges. They drink water when foraging, and gather around streams and rivers. Rhesus macaques have specialized pouch-like cheeks, allowing them to temporarily hoard their food.

In psychological research, rhesus macaques have demonstrated a variety of complex cognitive abilities, including the ability to make same-different judgments, understand simple rules, and monitor their own mental states. They have even been shown to demonstrate self-agency, an important type of self-awareness. In 2014, onlookers at a train station in Kanpur, India, documented a rhesus monkey, knocked unconscious by overhead power lines, that was revived by another rhesus that systematically administered a series of resuscitative actions.

Group structure 

Like other macaques, rhesus troops comprise a mixture of 20–200 males and females. Females may outnumber the males by a ratio of 4:1. Males and females both have separate hierarchies. Female philopatry, common among social mammals, has been extensively studied in rhesus macaques. Females tend not to leave the social group, and have highly stable matrilineal hierarchies in which a female's rank is dependent on the rank of her mother. In addition, a single group may have multiple matrilineal lines existing in a hierarchy, and a female outranks any unrelated females that rank lower than her mother. Rhesus macaques are unusual in that the youngest females tend to outrank their older sisters. This is likely because young females are more fit and fertile. Mothers seem to prevent the older daughters from forming coalitions against her. The youngest daughter is the most dependent on the mother, and would have nothing to gain from helping her siblings in overthrowing their mother. Since each daughter had a high rank in her early years, rebelling against her mother is discouraged. Juvenile male macaques also exist in matrilineal lines, but once they reach four to five years of age, they are driven out of their natal groups by the dominant male. Thus, adult males gain dominance by age and experience.

In the group, macaques position themselves based on rank. The "central male subgroup" contains the two or three oldest and most dominant males which are codominant, along with females, their infants, and juveniles. This subgroup occupies the center of the group and determines the movements, foraging, and other routines. The females of this subgroup are also the most dominant of the entire group. The farther to the periphery a subgroup is, the less dominant it is. Subgroups on the periphery of the central group are run by one dominant male, of a rank lower than the central males, and he maintains order in the group, and communicates messages between the central and peripheral males. A subgroup of subordinate, often subadult, males occupy the very edge of the groups, and have the responsibility of communicating with other macaque groups and making alarm calls. Rhesus social behaviour has been described as despotic, in that high-ranking individuals often show little tolerance, and frequently become aggressive towards non-kin. Top-ranking female rhesus monkeys are known to sexually coerce unreceptive males and also physically injure them, biting off digits and damaging their genitals.

Rhesus macaques have been observed engaging in interspecies grooming with Hanuman langurs and with Sambar deer.

Communication 
Rhesus macaques interact using a variety of facial expressions, vocalizations, body postures, and gestures. Perhaps the most common facial expression the macaque makes is the "silent bared teeth" face. This is made between individuals of different social ranks, with the lower-ranking one giving the expression to its superior. A less-dominant individual also makes a "fear grimace", accompanied by a scream, to appease or redirect aggression. Another submissive behavior is the "present rump", where an individual raises its tail and exposes its genitals to the dominant one. A dominant individual threatens another individual by standing quadrupedally and making a silent "open mouth stare" accompanied by the tail sticking straight. During movements, macaques make coos and grunts. These are also made during affiliative interactions, and approaches before grooming. When they find rare food of high quality, macaques emit warbles, harmonic arches, or chirps. When in threatening situations, macaques emit a single loud, high-pitched sound called a shrill bark. Screeches, screams, squeaks, pant-threats, growls, and barks are used during aggressive interactions. Infants "gecker" to attract their mother's attention.

Reproduction 

Adult male macaques try to maximize their reproductive success by entering into sex with females both in and outside the breeding period. Females prefer to mate with males that are not familiar to them. Outsider males who are not members of the female's own troop are preferred over higher-ranking males. Outside of the consortship period, males and females return the prior behavior of not exhibiting preferential treatment or any special relationship. The breeding period can last up to eleven days, and a female usually mates with numerous males during that time. Male rhesus macaques have been observed to fight for access to sexually receptive females and they suffer more wounds during the mating season. Female macaques first breed when they are four years old and reach menopause at around twenty-five years of age. Male macaques generally play no role in raising the young but do have peaceful relationships with the offspring of their consort pairs.

Manson and Parry found that free-ranging rhesus macaques avoid inbreeding. Adult females were never observed to copulate with males of their own matrilineage during their fertile periods.

Mothers with one or more immature daughters in addition to their infants are in contact with their infants less than those with no older immature daughters, because the mothers may pass the parenting responsibilities to their daughters. High-ranking mothers with older immature daughters also reject their infants significantly more than those without older daughters and tend to begin mating earlier in the mating season than expected based on their dates of parturition the preceding birth season. Infants farther from the center of the groups are more vulnerable to infanticide from outside groups. Some mothers abuse their infants, which is believed to be the result of controlling parenting styles.

Self-awareness 
In several experiments giving mirrors to rhesus monkeys, they looked into the mirrors and groomed themselves, as well as flexed various muscle groups. This behaviour indicates that they recognised and were aware of themselves.

Human - Rhesus conflict 
The Macaque–human relationships is complex and culturally specific, ranging from relatively peaceful coexistence to extreme levels of conflict. The relationship between rhesus macaques and humans is in constant change, with conflict being shaped by historic changes in social and cultural practices.  The changing perceptions of nature and human-nature relationships is influenced by larger political-economic decisions. When looking at conflict between humans and rhesus macaques there lacks an integrative approach that draws upon multiple fields to provide a more holistic understanding of the emergence and evolution of this conflict. Conflicts can be as a result of  rapidly changing agricultural practices, increasing infrastructure to support urbanisation, and emerging economic activities (e.g., tourism, food processing etc.) requiring more clearing of land including forests, and rising numbers of rhesus macaques. The issue is multi-dimensional and has a direct connection to overall economic policy – more specifically the relationship among agricultural, forest, and land use policies.  Deeply understanding factors relating to conflict is all the more critical in an uncertain and unpredictable future of climate change that is likely to increase the vulnerability of fragile mountain ecosystems and marginal communities.

Conflict between Rhesus Macaques and humans is at all time high, with areas once forested habitat being converted to industrial agriculture. Specifically looking at Nepal, this process has increased urban infrastructure such as housing and roads that increasingly fragment forest ecosystems. The expansion of monocultures, increased forest fragmentation, degradation of natural habitats, and changing agricultural practices have led to a significant increase in the frequency of human-macaque conflict.Crop raiding is one of the biggest visible effects of Human-Rhesus conflict occurring where Rhesus Macaque feed on growing crops that directly effected harvest size, and crop health with corn, and rice. The estimated financial cost to individual farmer households of macaque corn and rice raiding is approximately US$ 14.9 or 4.2% of their yearly income.This has resulted in farmers and other members of the population viewing macaques inhabiting agricultural landscapes as serious crop pests.Nepal is a significant study area with almost 44% of Nepal's land area containing suitable habitat for rhesus macaques but only having 8% of such suitable area being protected national parks. As well the rating of Rhesus macaques as the top ten crop-raiding wildlife species in Nepal adds to such negative perception. Studying crop raiding behaviour is essential to developing effective strategies to manage human-macaque conflict while promoting both primate conservation and the economic well-being of the local community. It is stated that the human-macaque conflict is one of the most critical challenges faced by wildlife managers. Suggestions to mitigate conflict include "prioritizing forest restoration programs, strategic management plans designed to connect isolated forest fragments with high rhesus macaque population densities, creating government programs that compensate farmers for income lost due to crop-raiding, and educational outreach that informs local villagers of the importance of conservation and protecting biodiversity". Mitigation strategies offers the most effective solutions to reduce conflict occurring between rhesus macaques and humans in Nepal.

India is another country that is seeing the rise of human - macaque conflict. Macaque-Human conflict particularly occurs in the twin hill-states of Uttarakhand and Himachal Pradesh with such conflict being a source of contentious debate in political scenarios, resentment and polarization amongst agriculturalists and wildlife conservationists. In India crop raiding by rhesus macaques has been identified as the main cause of conflict. In urban areas, rhesus macaques damage property and injure people in house raids in order to access food and provisions. Whereas in agricultural areas, they cause financial losses to farmers due to crop depredation. The estimated extent of crop damages in Himachal Pradesh ranges from 10–100% to 40–80% of all crop losses. The financial implications of such damage is estimated at approximately USD$ 200,000 in agriculture and USD$ 150,000 in horticulture.  Quantification of crop and financial loses is challenging with a potential misrepresentation due to farmer perspectives where perception of perceived losses are potentially higher, than actual losses. This has led to harsh actions against rhesus macaque communities. Another factor in rhesus perception includes economic status, farmer economic stability, cultural attitudes towards the given species and the frequency and intensity of wildlife conflicts. All of the above have resulted in changed in conservation and management with legal rhesus macaque culling issued in 2010.

Human wildlife conflict is also occurring in China, specifically in the area of Longyang District, Baoshan City, Yunnan Province. The peak period of conflict occurs from August-October when wildlife overlaps with humans severely due to the high natural productivity stemming from the warm and humid climate. Factors associated with accessibility and availability of food and shelter appear to be the key drivers of human-macaque conflict, with an overall increase between the years of 2012 and 2021.

One key factor of conflict that directly effects the human macaque relationship is visibility.  Visibility of rhesus macaques in agroecosystem dominated areas largely impacts conflict between humans and rhesus macaques. The conspicuous presence of rhesus macaques in and around farms results in farmers believing that macaques cause heavy crop depredations which, in turn, have  led to negative perceptions and actions against the species. Whereas visibility in urban areas can result in a positive relationship, areas include around temples, and tourist areas where their dietary needs are largely met by food provisioning.  

Towards the end of March 2018, it was reported that a monkey had entered a house in the village of Talabasta, Indian state of Odisha, and kidnapped a baby. The baby was later found dead in a well. Though monkeys are known to attack people, enter homes, and damage property, this reported behaviour was unusual.

Population management tools 
Managing conflict between humans and rhesus macaque is a difficult challenge. As mentioned previously there are many factors that go into why conflict occurs. This nuanced relationship requires thoughtfulness in management practices. Behaviour and population management are the two main areas of management that humans will look into to try and minimize conflict, protect wildlife, and promote co-existence.  

When looking at and altering behaviour, crop raiding is the potentially the most significant behaviour change that is crucial in reducing conflict rates. One example is the implementation of guards in agricultural setting to chase off intruding monkeys using dogs slingshot, and firecrackers. This method is no-lethal and can alter behavioural patterns of crop raiding monkeys. Another strategy that farmers can employ is to plant alternative, buffer crops which are unattractive to monkeys in high-conflict zones such as along the edges of macaque habitat. In urban settings planting food trees within city periphery and country parks aim to discourage macaques from entering nearby residential areas for food.

Better establishing tourism and urban behaviour in areas that have population of rhesus macaques as means to facilitate better relationship. In areas of tourism human behaviour is necessary to prevent conflict. One method of this is to introduce public education programs as well as  restrict visitors to specific viewing platforms, with the goal to minimize physical proximity. An important aspect is enforcing no feed regulations that only allow provisioning to be performed by trained staff at scheduled times. Regulating visitor behaviours that provoke aggressive responses from macaques, including noise regulation greatly benefits conflict reduction. Replacing food conditioned behaviours established by human visitors and further human education will greatly aid in returning co-existence between rhesus macaques and humans.

A method of population management is translocation. Translocation of problem macaques in urban rhesus communities in India has been employed as a non-lethal solution to human–macaque conflicts. Translocation can be seen as a short term fix due to the fact that they have the potential to return, and other rhesus macaques populations may take their place. As well translocation can be inappropriate when there is a lack of suitable habitat to move animals because of anthropogenic habitat modification. Before translocation occurs there must be a cost benefit  appraisal of relative costs should be done to quantify the resources it will take. An in depth understanding of issues prior to translocation is vital for positive effects to occur. Recognizing landscape health and productivity is the first step before making management decisions.

Another tool of population management is found in sterilisation and/or contraceptive programmes that represent an alternative management practice. Fertility control looks to be a feasible management tool for reducing human–macaque conflict because it avoids the extermination of the animals and avoids costs and problems associated with translocation. Although there is potential of sterilization and general fertility control to be positive there is limited research and understanding of the long term effects of sterilization programs and its effectivity.

In science 

The rhesus macaque is well known to science. Due to its relatively easy upkeep in captivity, wide availability, and closeness to humans anatomically and physiologically, it has been used extensively in medical and biological research on human and animal health-related topics. It has given its name to the Rh factor, one of the elements of a person's blood group, by the discoverers of the factor, Karl Landsteiner and Alexander Wiener. The rhesus macaque was also used in the well-known experiments on maternal deprivation carried out in the 1950s by controversial comparative psychologist Harry Harlow. Other medical breakthroughs facilitated by the use of the rhesus macaque include:
 development of the rabies, smallpox, and polio vaccines
 creation of drugs to manage HIV/AIDS
 understanding of the female reproductive cycle and development of the embryo and the propagation of embryonic stem cells.

The U.S. Army, the U.S. Air Force, and NASA launched rhesus macaques into outer space during the 1950s and 1960s, and the Soviet/Russian space program launched them into space as recently as 1997 on the Bion missions. Albert II became the first primate and first mammal in space during a U.S. V-2 rocket suborbital flight on 14 June 1949, and died on impact when a parachute failed.

Another rhesus monkey, Able, was launched on a suborbital spaceflight in 1959, and was among the first living beings (along with Miss Baker, a squirrel monkey on the same mission) to travel in space and return alive.

On 25 October 1999, the rhesus macaque became the first cloned primate with the birth of Tetra. January 2001 had the birth of ANDi, the first transgenic primate; ANDi carries foreign genes originally from a jellyfish.

Though most studies of the rhesus macaque are from various locations in northern India, some knowledge of the natural behavior of the species comes from studies carried out on a colony established by the Caribbean Primate Research Center of the University of Puerto Rico on the island of Cayo Santiago, off Puerto Rico. No predators are on the island, and humans are not permitted to land except as part of the research programmes. The colony is provisioned to some extent, but about half of its food comes from natural foraging.

Rhesus macaques, like many macaques, carry the herpes B virus. This virus does not typically harm the monkey, but is very dangerous to humans in the rare event that it jumps species, for example in the 1997 death of Yerkes National Primate Research Center researcher Elizabeth Griffin.

Genome sequencing 

Work on the genome of the rhesus macaque was completed in 2007, making the species the second nonhuman primate whose genome was sequenced. Humans and macaques apparently share about 93% of their DNA sequence and shared a common ancestor roughly 25 million years ago. The rhesus macaque has 21 pairs of chromosomes.

Comparison of rhesus macaques, chimpanzees, and humans revealed the structure of ancestral primate genomes, positive selection pressure and lineage-specific expansions, and contractions of gene families. "The goal is to reconstruct the history of every gene in the human genome," said Evan Eichler, University of Washington, Seattle. DNA from different branches of the primate tree will allow us "to trace back the evolutionary changes that occurred at various time points, leading from the common ancestors of the primate clade to Homo sapiens," said Bruce Lahn, University of Chicago.

After the human and chimpanzee genomes were sequenced and compared, it was usually impossible to tell whether differences were the result of the human or chimpanzee gene changing from the common ancestor. After the rhesus macaque genome was sequenced, three genes could be compared. If two genes were the same, they were presumed to be the original gene.

The chimpanzee and human genome diverged 6 million years ago. They have 98% identity and many conserved regulatory regions. Comparing the macaque and human genomes, further identified evolutionary pressure and gene function. Like the chimpanzee, changes were on the level of gene rearrangements rather than single mutations. Frequent insertions, deletions, changes in the order and number of genes, and segmental duplications near gaps, centromeres and telomeres occurred. So, macaque, chimpanzee, and human chromosomes are mosaics of each other.

Some normal gene sequences in healthy macaques and chimpanzees cause profound disease in humans. For example, the normal sequence of phenylalanine hydroxylase in macaques and chimpanzees is the mutated sequence responsible for phenylketonuria in humans. So, humans must have been under evolutionary pressure to adopt a different mechanism. Some gene families are conserved or under evolutionary pressure and expansion in all three primate species, while some are under expansion uniquely in human, chimpanzee, or macaque. For example, cholesterol pathways are conserved in all three species (and other primate species). In all three species, immune response genes are under positive selection, and genes of T cell-mediated immunity, signal transduction, cell adhesion, and membrane proteins generally. Genes for keratin, which produce hair shafts, were rapidly evolving in all three species, possibly because of climate change or mate selection. The X chromosome has three times more rearrangements than other chromosomes. The macaque gained 1,358 genes by duplication. Triangulation of human, chimpanzee, and macaque sequences showed expansion of gene families in each species.

The PKFP gene, important in sugar (fructose) metabolism, is expanded in macaques, possibly because of their high-fruit diet. So are genes for the olfactory receptor, cytochrome P450 (which degrades toxins), and CCL3L1-CCL4 (associated in humans with HIV susceptibility). Immune genes are expanded in macaques, relative to all four great ape species. The macaque genome has 33 major histocompatibility genes, three times those of human. This has clinical significance because the macaque is used as an experimental model of the human immune system.

In humans, the preferentially expressed antigen of melanoma (PRAME) gene family is expanded. It is actively expressed in cancers, but normally is testis-specific, possibly involved in spermatogenesis. The PRAME family has 26 members on human chromosome 1. In the macaque, it has eight, and has been very simple and stable for millions of years. The PRAME family arose in translocations in the common mouse-primate ancestor 85 million years ago, and is expanded on mouse chromosome 4.

DNA microarrays are used in macaque research. For example, Michael Katze of University of Washington, Seattle, infected macaques with 1918 and modern influenzas. The DNA microarray showed the macaque genomic response to human influenza on a cellular level in each tissue. Both viruses stimulated innate immune system inflammation, but the 1918 flu stimulated stronger and more persistent inflammation, causing extensive tissue damage, and it did not stimulate the interferon-1 pathway. The DNA response showed a transition from innate to adaptive immune response over seven days.

The full sequence and annotation of the macaque genome is available on the Ensembl genome browser.

Conservation status 
The rhesus macaque is listed as Least Concern on the IUCN Red List and estimated to exist in large numbers; it is tolerant of a broad range of habitats, including urban environments. Rhesus macaques have the largest natural range of any non-human primate which contributes to the conservation status of "least concern". The Thai population is locally threatened. In addition to habitat destruction and agricultural encroachment, pet releases of the different species into existing troops are diluting the gene pool and putting its genetic integrity at risk. Despite the wealth of information on their ecology and behaviour, little attention has been paid to their demography or population status, which can pose a risk for future rhesus macaque population. Rhesus macaques increased population stress on other species, having extended their distributional limits by approximately 3,500 km2 in Southeastern India. The increased area of rhesus macaques has been caused by human intervention tactics whereby village translocation occurs from urban conflict ridden areas. This influx has led to the widespread establishment of the rhesus macaque, accompanied by the disappearance of the bonnet macaque in these areas.

See also
 Girneys

References

External links 

 ARKive: images and movies of the rhesus macaque Macaca mulatta
 Brain maps and brain atlases of rhesus macaque
 Primate Info Net: Macaca mulatta Factsheet
 University of Michigan Museum of Zoology's Animal Diversity Web: Macaca mulatta
 Macaca mulatta Genome
 Rhesus Play Film analysis of agonistic play by Donald Symons (UCSB) on DVD
 View the Macaque genome in Ensembl.
 

Animal models
Fauna of Yunnan
rhesus macaque
rhesus macaque
Mammals of Afghanistan
Mammals of Bangladesh
Mammals of Bhutan
Mammals of China
Mammals of Hong Kong
Mammals of India
Mammals of Laos
Mammals of Myanmar
Mammals of Nepal
Mammals of Pakistan
Mammals of Thailand
Mammals of Vietnam
Monkeys in India
Primates of Asia
Space-flown life
Taxa named by Eberhard August Wilhelm von Zimmermann